The Waterberg flat lizard (Platysaurus minor) is a species of lizard in the family Cordylidae. It is endemic to South Africa.

Geography
The Waterberg flat lizard ranges from Waterberg, South Africa, to the foothills of the Blouberg. The Waterberg flat lizard lives in rocky sandstone outcrops in a savannah habitat.

Habits
The Waterberg flat lizard eats mainly insects, but will sometimes eat plants. It lives in small family groups and breeds in summer, when two eggs are produced.

Description
The Waterberg flat lizard is 60–70 mm long. The scales on the sides of its body are rounded, raised and larger than those on its back. Three longitudinal stripes are always entire on females, but sometimes divided in males.

References

External links
 More information on the Waterberg flat lizard

Platysaurus
Lizards of Africa
Endemic reptiles of South Africa
Taxa named by Vivian Frederick Maynard FitzSimons
Reptiles described in 1930